Tammi Patterson (born 3 January 1990) is an Australian former professional tennis player.

Patterson has won one singles title and ten doubles titles on the ITF Circuit. On 21 February 2011, she reached a career-high singles ranking of world No. 289. On 23 October 2017, she peaked at No. 215 in the doubles rankings.

Patterson made her Grand Slam debut at the 2016 Australian Open as a wildcard entry. She lost against former world No. 1, Ana Ivanovic, in the first round in straight sets, winning just five games and not being able to force a break point.

ITF Circuit finals

Singles: 2 (1 title, 1 runner–up)

Doubles: 21 (10 titles, 11 runner-ups)

References

External links
 
 
 

1990 births
Living people
Australian female tennis players
Sportswomen from New South Wales

Sportswomen from Victoria (Australia) 
Tennis players from Sydney
Tennis players from Melbourne
21st-century Australian women